Ámr (Old Norse and translates to "black", "loathsome") is the seventh studio album by Norwegian progressive metal artist Ihsahn. The album was released on 4 May 2018 through Candlelight Records. Official videos were released for "Arcana Imperii", "Wake" and "Lend Me the Eyes of Millennia".

The deluxe edition also features a bonus track, which is a poem by Edgar Allan Poe.

Track listing

Personnel

Musicians 
Ihsahn – vocals, guitars, bass guitar, keyboards
Tobias Ørnes Andersen – drums
Fredrik Åkesson – additional guitar solo on "Arcana Imperii"
Angell Solberg Tveitan – additional marching drum on "Where You Are Lost and I Belong"

Production 
 Linus Corneliusson – mixing
 Jens Bogren – mastering
 Ritxi Ostáriz – design
 Bjørn Tore Moen – front cover photo

Charts

References 

2018 albums
Ihsahn albums